Gassnova SF is the Norwegian state enterprise for carbon capture and storage.

State enterprise
Gassnova was established by the Norwegian authorities in 2005 to further the development of technologies and knowledge related to carbon capture and storage (CCS) and, in addition to this, serve as the adviser to the government on this issue. Gassnova is tasked with administrating the research and financing program, CLIMIT, and with ensuring the testing and developing of CCS technologies at the Technology Center Mongstad (TCM). Both CLIMIT and TCM are central elements in the work to realize Europe's first industrial-scale project for carbon capture and storage, now named Longship CCS.

Coordinating Longship CCS 
Gassnova has coordinated the studies at the emission sites of Norcem’s cement factory in Brevik owned by Heidelberg Cement as well as at the Fortum Oslo Varme’s (FOV) energy recovery plant in Oslo. Longship CCS will demonstrate that the technology is functional for larger industrial plants and can set a new standard for the future's industrial projects. Gassnova has evaluated the potential gains and prepared a decision basis for the government which delivered a proposal on financing of the CCS demo project. On 14 December 2020, the Norwegian Parliament decided to support the development of Longship in line with the Government's recommendation.

Gassnova SF was established on 29 June 2007 as a continuation of the administrative body Gassnova and is located in Porsgrunn. The CEO is Roy Vardheim.

External links 
Gassnova
CCS Norway
CLIMIT
Technology Center Mongstad (TCM)
Ministry of Petroleum and Energy

Carbon capture and storage
Climate change in Norway
Natural gas companies of Norway
Ministry of Petroleum and Energy
Government-owned companies of Norway
Energy companies established in 2005
Technology companies established in 2005
2005 establishments in Norway